The Hughes 24 is a Canadian trailerable sailboat that was designed by William Shaw as a cruiser and first built in 1966.

The boat is a development of Shaw's Nutmeg 24 design, which was built by Tanzer Industries and was likely built from the same moulds.

The design was developed into the much more commercially successful Hughes 25 in 1968, likely by modifying the existing moulds.

Production
The design was built by Hughes Boat Works in Canada, starting as a 1966 model year and was in fact their first keelboat design built in the new factory in Scarborough, Ontario. It was only built in small numbers.

Design
The Hughes 24 is a recreational keelboat, built predominantly of fibreglass, with wood trim. It has a masthead sloop rig, a raked stem and a fixed stub keel, with a retractable centreboard. It displaces  and carries  of ballast.

See also
List of sailing boat types

References

Keelboats
1980s sailboat type designs
Sailing yachts 
Trailer sailers
Sailboat type designs by William Shaw
Sailboat types built by Hughes Boat Works